The Nashville Songwriters Foundation is a non-profit organization foundation for the Nashville music community. Songwriters are inducted into the Nashville Songwriters Hall of Fame each year and the foundation's purpose is to "educate, archive, and celebrate the contributions of the members of the Nashville Songwriters Hall of Fame to the world of music."

As of 2022, the chair of the board of NSF is Sarah Cates.

See also 
Nashville Songwriters Hall of Fame

External links
Nashville Songwriters Foundation

Music organizations based in the United States
Non-profit organizations based in Tennessee
Music of Tennessee
Organizations based in Nashville, Tennessee
Culture of Nashville, Tennessee